The South East Europe Pipeline was a proposal for a natural gas pipeline from eastern Turkey to Baumgarten an der March in Austria. It was seen as an option for diversification of natural gas potential delivery routes for Europe from Azerbaijan. The main source of the gas would be Shah Deniz gas field when its second stage comes online.

The pipeline was proposed by BP on 24 September 2011 as an alternative to the existing Southern Gas Corridor projects, including the Nabucco pipeline, Trans Adriatic Pipeline, and Interconnector Turkey–Greece–Italy. The pipeline was to use existing pipelines, but also needed  (by other sources ) of new pipeline to be laid in different countries.

On 28 June 2012 the BP-led Shah Deniz consortium announced it will choose between Nabucco West and Trans Adriatic Pipeline as an export option, and accordingly development of the South East Europe Pipeline project will cease.

See also

 Nabucco pipeline
 Turkey–Greece pipeline
 Greece–Italy pipeline
 South Caucasus Pipeline
 Trans-Caspian Gas Pipeline
 New Europe Transmission System
 Nord Stream 1
 Russia–Ukraine gas dispute of 2005–2006
 Baku–Tbilisi–Ceyhan pipeline
 Mozdok – Makhachkala – Kazi Magomed pipeline

References

Natural gas pipelines in Bulgaria
Natural gas pipelines in Hungary
Natural gas pipelines in Romania
Natural gas pipelines in Austria
Cancelled energy infrastructure